Bad Family is a South Korean television series starring Kim Myung-min, Nam Sang-mi, Im Hyun-sik, Yeo Woon-kay, Kang Nam-gil, Geum Bo-ra, Kim Hee-chul and Lee Young-yoo. It aired on SBS from March 22 to May 11, 2006 on Wednesdays and Thursdays at 21:55 for 16 episodes.

Plot
Baek Na-rim is a nine-year-old girl living happily with her big, extended family. One day, while on their way to a family vacation, Ha In-soo, an unscrupulous businessman that Na-rim's father had cut ties with, desperately tries to flag down their van. But in the process, In-soo accidentally runs their van off the road, causing a car crash. Her entire family dies, and Na-rim is the sole survivor. Grabbing his opportunity, In-soo conceals that he was ever at the scene of the accident.

Traumatized from the accident, Na-rim now suffers from amnesia and speech impairment. Her doctor advises her only remaining relative Byun, an uncle who wasn't with the family at the time of the accident, that she shouldn't be exposed to any more shock and that it would aid in her recovery if she's reminded of her happy memories with her family. So Byun hires Oh Dal-geon, a former small-time gangster who runs an agency that provides fake wedding guests and fake funeral mourners, to create a seven-member "fake family" for Na-rim, exactly the same number of members as her real, deceased one.

Dal-geon auditions and hires six oddball characters, mostly entrepreneurs from the local market who owe him money: "fake grandfather" Jang Hwang-gu is an aging ladies' man and dancing instructor; "fake grandmother" Park Bok-nyeo is a foul-mouthed mandu (dumpling) seller; "fake mother" Uhm Ji-sook is a vain coffee seller (she and Bok-nyeo are longtime mortal enemies); "fake father" Jo Gi-dong is mild-mannered and therefore useless at his job of threatening people over the phone to pay their debts; "fake brother" Gong-min is a homeless youth Dal-geon found wandering the streets; "fake sister" Kim Yang-ah is a tough young woman raising her brothers, whose fishing boat was inadvertently destroyed by Dal-geon; lastly, Dal-geon himself plays the "fake uncle."

Byun installs his niece with the fake family in a nice house, and pays them a salary; in return, every day at a designated time, they must send him a cellphone photo with all family members present.

In the beginning, the fake family members don't get along, and hilarious situations arise as they try to take care of Na-rim while hiding their true identities and relationships. Meanwhile, the market is in crisis as a new supermarket built by In-soo threatens the locals' livelihood.

As their individual backstories are revealed, the family members come to care for each other like a real family. But complications arise when Dal-geon and Yang-ah fall in love, and more dangerously, In-soo would rather that Na-rim never regains her memory.

Cast
 Kim Myung-min as Oh Dal-geon, Na-rim's fake uncle
 Nam Sang-mi as Kim Yang-ah, Na-rim's fake sister
 Im Hyun-sik as Jang Hwang-gu, Na-rim's fake grandfather
 Yeo Woon-kay as Park Bok-nyeo, Na-rim's fake grandmother
 Kang Nam-gil as Jo Gi-dong, Na-rim's fake father
 Geum Bo-ra as Uhm Ji-sook, Na-rim's fake mother
 Kim Hee-chul as Gong-min, Na-rim's fake brother
 Lee Young-yoo as Baek Na-rim
 Kim Kyu-chul as Ha In-soo
 Hyun Young as Ha Boo-kyung, In-soo's niece
 Park Jin-woo as Ha Tae-kyung, In-soo's son
 Yoo Hyung-kwan as Deputy chief Byun, Na-rim's uncle
 Jo Deok-hyun as Dokgo Pa, gangster
 Choi Ha-na as Noh Ah-na
 Han Young-kwang
 Lee Hyun
 Oh Ji-eun

Ratings

Source: TNSMK Korea

Awards
 2006 SBS Drama Awards: PD Award - Kim Myung-min

References

External links
 Bad Family official SBS website 
 

Seoul Broadcasting System television dramas
2006 South Korean television series debuts
2006 South Korean television series endings
Korean-language television shows